Taltali is an upazila of Barguna District in the division of Barisal, Bangladesh.

History 
Taltali Upazila was established on 25 April 2012. It was previously part of Amtali Upazila.

Geography 
It covers an area of 258.94 km2 with the population of 88,004 people. It's literacy rate is 89%. It is by the Bay of Bengal. The Burishwar river and Barguna Sadar Upazila are on the west of it. Andharmanik river and Kalapara Upazila of Patuakhali are in the east.

Demographics 
Taltoli upazila consisted with the population of 88,004 people. It's literacy rate is 89%. Most of The area is Rural Based.Farmer's and Fishermen are the Leading profession.She has a Natural Forest  Reserve Named TengraGiri Eco Park and a Clean and Calm Beach Named Shuvo-Shondha, Many Tourists come here to Enjoy the Natural Beauty of Paira-Bishkhali-Bay of Bengal Mohona.Some Rakhaine people are still living Here.

Administration
Taltali Upazila is divided into seven union parishads: Barabagi, Chhotabagi, Kariibaria, Nishanbaria, Panchakoralia, Sarikkhali, and Sonakata.

See also 
 Upazilas of Bangladesh
 Districts of Bangladesh
 Divisions of Bangladesh

References 

Populated places in Barguna District
Upazilas of Barguna District